Fariha al-Berkawi was a Libyan politician who was assassinated on 17 July 2014.

Career
Berkawi had been the representative for Derna District in the General National Congress. She was a member of the non-Islamist National Forces Alliance and a member of the budget committee.

Death
Berkawi was shot by a gunman on 17 July 2014 at a gas station in Derna, three weeks after Salwa Bughaighis' assassination. Berkawi had strongly condemned Bughaighis' death.

Personal life
Berkawi was married. Her husband had been a longtime political prisoner under Muammar Gaddafi.

References

2014 deaths
National Forces Alliance politicians
People from Derna, Libya
Assassinated Libyan politicians
People murdered in Libya
Assassinated politicians
Libyan women in politics
2014 murders in Libya
Assassinations in Libya